Farewell Song is a 1982 collection of nine previously unreleased recordings of  Janis Joplin with Big Brother and the Holding Company, the Kozmic Blues Band, and Full Tilt Boogie Band. Tracks include Cheap Thrills-era outtakes and live performances; "Misery 'N", "Farewell Song", and "Catch Me Daddy".

Production
The recordings were enhanced through the use of devices such as the Lexicon 224 and the ADR Scamp Rack by producer Elliot Mazer, and the original bass by Peter Albin on "Farewell Song" was replaced with bass work by Mazer. Some members of Big Brother and the Holding Company were unhappy about some of these changes. The original versions can be found on the subsequent compilation Janis.

One Night Stand was produced by Todd Rundgren and performed with the Paul Butterfield Blues Band and became a minor hit upon release. Tell Mama is the only Full Tilt Boogie Band track.

Track listing
 "Tell Mama" (Live) (Marcus Daniel, Wilbur Terrell, Clarence Carter) – 5:46
 "Magic of Love" (Live) (Mark Spoelstra) – 3:02
 "Misery'N" (Peter Albin, James Gurley, Sam Andrew, David Getz, Janis Joplin) – 4:13
 "One Night Stand" (Steve Gordon, Barry Flast) – 3:07
 "Harry" (Peter Albin, James Gurley, Sam Andrew, David Getz, Janis Joplin) – 0:57
 "Raise Your Hand" (Live) (Steve Cropper, Eddie Floyd, Alvertis Isbell) – 3:44
 "Farewell Song" (Live) (Sam Andrew) – 4:36
 "Medley: Amazing Grace/Hi-Heel Sneakers" (Live) – 2:35
 "Catch Me Daddy" (Peter Albin, James Gurley, Sam Andrew, David Getz, Janis Joplin) – 4:50

Personnel
 Janis Joplin – vocals
 Terry Clements – tenor saxophone
 Richard Kermode – organ
 Brad Campbell – bass
 Clark Pierson – drums
 Ken Pearson – organ
 Cornelius "Snookey" Flowers – baritone saxophone
 Richard Bell – piano
 David Getz – drums
 John Till – guitar
 Roy Markowitz – drums
 Sam Andrew – guitar
 Luis Gasca – trumpet
 Peter Albin – bass
 James Gurley – guitar

References

External links
 

Janis Joplin compilation albums
Compilation albums published posthumously
1983 compilation albums
Columbia Records compilation albums